Eurytela is a genus of nymphalid butterfly, commonly called pipers, found in Africa.

Species
Listed alphabetically:
Eurytela alinda Mabille, 1893
Eurytela dryope (Cramer, [1775]) – golden piper 
Eurytela hiarbas (Drury, 1770) – pied piper 
Eurytela narinda Ward, 1872

References

Seitz, A. Die Gross-Schmetterlinge der Erde 13: Die Afrikanischen Tagfalter. Plate XIII 49

Biblidinae
Nymphalidae genera
Taxa named by Jean Baptiste Boisduval